Paul McIntyre may refer to: 
Paul McIntyre (footballer) (born 1987), Scottish footballer
Paul McIntyre (politician), Canadian senator
Paul McIntyre (scientist), American nanotechnologist